The Autozam AZ-1, known by the framecode PG6SA, is a mid-engined kei-class sports car, designed and manufactured by Mazda under its Autozam brand. Suzuki provided the engine as well as the inspiration for the design.

Manufactured from October 1992 to October 1994, the AZ-1 was noted for its gullwing doors.

Suzuki later produced its own badge engineered version named the Suzuki Cara (PG6SS).

History

Pre-production

Suzuki prototypes
The proposal for the AZ-1 goes as far back as 1985 when Suzuki created the Suzuki RS/1 as a mid-engine sports car project for volume production. Suzuki's design for the Tokyo Motor Show was more than just a design exercise, they designed a fully functional car with a front/rear weight distribution of 45:55, powered by a modified 1.3-liter G13B engine borrowed from the Cultus GTi.

This was followed up by the Tatsumi Fukunaga-designed RS/3, unveiled for the 1987 Tokyo Motor Show. This version of the car retained many of its design features of the predecessor, but many of its design features were modified to meet Japanese safety regulations as well as for practicality. However, the project was abandoned in favor of the roadster project they had been working on, named later the Cappuccino.

Mazda's design team, led by Toshihiko Hirai, who was also responsible for the MX-5, took over the design project, despite having a limited  budget and capacity.

Mazda prototypes
The redesigned cars, constructed in tube frame with floors and bulkheads constructed from aluminium honeycomb, clad in three different body styles constructed in fiberglass. The cars were constructed around the Kei car regulations of the time (maximum length , maximum engine capacity 550 cc), until this was changed for the following March, hence its model name, AZ-550 Sports.

First introduced at the 1989 Tokyo Motor Show as the AZ-550 with three versions.

The Type A was a red sports car with pop-up headlights, front air vent and a distinctive Ferrari Testarossa inspired side strakes but most distinctive of all design features were the gull-wing doors.

The Type B, themed as  "High-tuned pure sports", was inspired by the trends in the tuning industry and in current concept car design, featuring greenhouse pyramid roof without a rearward sweep to the C-pillar. It had a racing car inspired interior, unlike Type A, it was aiming for the rough and spartan look and was the only model that a more conventional forward door hinging. It featured a pair of bulging headlamps and incorporated dual mufflers.

The Type C, had a more distinctive body design as it was inspired by Mazda's Group C sports prototype racers, incorporating its signature colour scheme of blue on white and its number it bore at the 24 hours of Le Mans. Featuring a bigger air intake than the former two, venting to the forward-positioned radiator and exits it along the front rim of the cowl. There are many design cues typical to an endurance racer such as the wing mirror and BBS style brake-cooling wheel discs. Compared to the Type B, this version was far more spartan in comparison.

Pre-production
As the cars were well received by the visiting public and the motoring press, Mazda executives decided on production of the car. Although Type C was the better received of the three, it was the Type A which was given the greenlight by executives as they believed that it would be the one most commercially accepted by the buying public. The Type A would only receive a minor design alteration prior to production, as the pop-up headlights were dropped in favour of fixed units, purely for structural rigidity reasons. The front air vent was the other design alteration made to the car prior to production.

Nonetheless, the car took three years to get into production as the engineering team changed the car's internal skeleton frame to steel to allow for further rigidity. The dashboard design was also changed, to a less futuristic but still sporting look.

Much of the development work was carried out in the United Kingdom despite the fact that the car was never intended for sale outside Japan.

Production

The car was made available to the buying public in January 1992, with two color options, Siberia Blue and Classic Red. Both colors came with Venetian Gray lower panels. Each car was sold through the Autozam dealer network in Japan.

Unfortunately by the time car came into production, the recession in Japan had just come into force. Selling for 1,498 million ¥ (the equivalent of $12,400), it was slightly less than a Eunos Roadster, but marginally higher than its competitor, the Honda Beat selling at 1,388 million ¥ and the Suzuki Cappuccino at ¥1,458 million,  the AZ-1 was considered to be both too expensive and too cramped for a kei car. The car failed to sell within its target of 800 per month, in the midst of an economic recession. Production of the car ended after the following year, but Mazda had plenty of stock to sell off.

With a total production of 4,392 over a year, plus 531 Suzuki Cara, compared to 28,010 Cappuccinos and 33,600 Beats (both with production reaching into the latter half of the 1990s).

Alternative versions
In a bid to shift unsold stock, Mazda made an effort to produce special versions. First to come was the Type L option, featuring an enhanced audio system including a sub-woofer in the boot. There were no exterior changes made to the car.

Mazdaspeed

Mazda also introduced the Mazdaspeed version to showcase the parts that were available for the car, the A-spec, the body kit features an enhanced hood, front spoiler and rear wing. Unlike the production version, the car came in an all-red or blue body color. It also came with a host of options including shock absorbers with sports spring sets, strut bars for the front and rear, mechanical LSD, enhanced air filter and a stainless steel and ceramic muffler. It also came with its own brand of alloy wheels as opposed to the production's steel wheels.

M2 1015
For 1994, There was also the M2 1015 by M2 Incorporated. The most distinguishing part of the car is the front fog lights incorporated into the bonnet, and the all-new front bumper and rear spoiler. The car came in three different colours: white, black and silver. Like the Mazdaspeed version, the car was painted entirely in a single color.

Fifty were to be produced and sold by the M2 dealer, but they only managed to sell about half of its stock. The dealer covered their losses by selling the body parts individually. A genuine "M2 1015" can be identified by the rear emblem stating the version name.

Suzuki Cara
See Suzuki Cara in Japanese Wikipedia
The AZ-1 was also sold by Suzuki as the Cara, with only minor detail changes including the addition of fog lamps.

Other versions
Although the M2 1015 was the only version sold by M2, they also created other versions purely for show purposes and to test market their cars.

M2 1014 was a one-off off-road inspired car built for the 1993 Tokyo Motor Show with design cues coming from the Lamborghini Cheetah. M2 1015A is a rally inspired featuring auxiliaries of a rally car including a pair of spotlights detached on the bottom of the bonnet. The M2 1015B incorporated a detachable top roof, instead of being constructed of glass, it was constructed in plastic.

In 1996, renowned tuning company and rotary specialist, RE Amemiya produced another one-off example for the Tokyo Auto Salon, called the GReddy VI-AZ1 (named after its long-term partner, the sixth incarnation of their partnership project car), it was influenced by the AZ-550 Type-C but longer and wider, incorporating a 20B three rotor Wankel engine, mounted longitudinally. The only part of the car that has traces of the original AZ-1 is the gullwing door. The car uses suspension parts produced by Bilstein that can be found in a Porsche 962 and the brakes from a Ferrari F40. The car was rebuilt again in 2000 with the car now resprayed to white, also a wing replacing the ducktail spoiler of the original, also replaced was the tire with a slightly wider version, brakes are replaced by those from a Ferrari F50.

There was also a one-off version built in 1996 named Abarth Scorpione commissioned by Shiro Kosaka, a renowned collector of Abarth sports cars. This car has unique bodywork featuring numerous design cues from its rare namesake, although the genuine car in fact features conventional opening doors. The car was entirely rebodied at a cost of one million yen for the body alone, plus another million yen for painting and fitting. For further details refer to this article (Japanese).

References

External links

 The Suzuki Cara Enthusiast Website
 AZ-1,the exciting micro coupé
 世界最小のスーパーカー（笑）AZ-1のページ 
 マイスター鈴木のページ 
 AZ-1を楽しもう にっしゃのガレージ 

AZ-1
Kei cars
Sports cars
Coupés
Rear mid-engine, rear-wheel-drive vehicles
Automobiles with gull-wing doors
Cars introduced in 1992
OEM Suzuki vehicles